Misagh Tehran Futsal Club was an Iranian futsal club based in Tehran.

Dissolution 

On 14 August 2016 Misagh terminated their activities due to financial problems.

Season-by-season 
The table below chronicles the achievements of the Club in various competitions.

Honors 
National:
Iranian Futsal Hazfi Cup
 Runners-up (1): 2013–14
 Tehran Province League
 Champions (2): 2008, 2009
 Local League
 Champions (1): 2009-10
 Iran Futsal's 2nd Division
 Champions (1): 2010
 Iran Futsal's 1st Division
 Champions (1): 2010-11

First-team squad

External links 
Official site
Misagh's Stats and History in PersianLeague

References 

Futsal clubs in Iran
Sport in Tehran
2008 establishments in Iran
2016 disestablishments in Iran
Futsal clubs established in 2008
Sports clubs disestablished in 2016
Defunct futsal clubs in Iran